In mathematics, Maschke's theorem, named after Heinrich Maschke, is a theorem in group representation theory that concerns the decomposition of representations of a finite group into irreducible pieces. Maschke's theorem allows one to make general conclusions about representations of a finite group G without actually computing them. It reduces the task of classifying all representations to a more manageable task of classifying irreducible representations, since when the theorem applies, any representation is a direct sum of irreducible pieces (constituents). Moreover, it follows from the Jordan–Hölder theorem that, while the decomposition into a direct sum of irreducible subrepresentations may not be unique, the irreducible pieces have well-defined multiplicities. In particular, a representation of a finite group over a field of characteristic zero is determined up to isomorphism by its character.

Formulations 

Maschke's theorem addresses the question: when is a general (finite-dimensional) representation built from irreducible subrepresentations using the direct sum operation? This question (and its answer) are formulated differently for different perspectives on group representation theory.

Group-theoretic 

Maschke's theorem is commonly formulated as a corollary to the following result:

Then the corollary is

The vector space of complex-valued class functions of a group  has a natural -invariant inner product structure, described in the article Schur orthogonality relations.

Module-theoretic 
One of the approaches to representations of finite groups is through module theory. Irreducible representations correspond to simple modules. In the module-theoretic language, Maschke's theorem asks: is an arbitrary module semisimple? In this context, the theorem can be reformulated as follows:

The importance of this result stems from the well developed theory of semisimple rings, in particular, the Artin–Wedderburn theorem (sometimes referred to as Wedderburn's Structure Theorem). When  is the field of complex numbers, this shows that the algebra  is a product of several copies of complex matrix algebras, one for each irreducible representation.

Category-theoretic 

Reformulated in the language of semi-simple categories, Maschke's theorem states

Proofs

Group-theoretic 
Let U be a subspace of V complement of W. Let  be the projection function, i.e.,  for any . 

so  implies that .

Therefore, .

Module-theoretic 
Let V be a K[G]-submodule. We will prove that V is a direct summand. Let π be any K-linear projection of K[G] onto V. Consider the map 

Then φ is again a projection: it is clearly K-linear, maps K[G] to V, and induces the identity on V (therefore, maps K[G] onto V). Moreover we have

so φ is in fact K[G]-linear. By the splitting lemma, . This proves that every submodule is a direct summand, that is, K[G] is semisimple.

Converse statement 
The above proof depends on the fact that #G is invertible in K. This might lead one to ask if the converse of Maschke's theorem also holds: if the characteristic of K divides the order of G, does it follow that K[G] is not semisimple? The answer is yes.

Proof. For  define . Let . Then I is a K[G]-submodule. We will prove that for every nontrivial submodule V of K[G], . Let V be given, and let  be any nonzero element of V. If , the claim is immediate. Otherwise, let . Then  so  and 
 

so that  is a nonzero element of both I and V. This proves V is not a direct complement of I for all V, so K[G] is not semisimple.

Non-examples 
The theorem can not apply to the case where G is infinite, or when the field K has characteristics dividing #G. For example, 

Notes

References

Representation theory of finite groups
Theorems in group theory
Theorems in representation theory